Georgios Giziotis (born 22 August 1972) is a Greek swimmer. He competed in two events at the 1996 Summer Olympics.

References

External links
 

1972 births
Living people
Greek male swimmers
Olympic swimmers of Greece
Swimmers at the 1996 Summer Olympics
Place of birth missing (living people)